Anoecophysis is a genus of moths belonging to family Tortricidae, with a single species found in Borneo and Pulo Laut.

Species
Anoecophysis branchiodes (Meyrick, 1910)

See also
List of Tortricidae genera

References

External links
Tortricid.net

Monotypic moth genera
Moths of Indonesia
Eucosmini
Tortricidae genera
Taxa named by Alexey Diakonoff